Greg Smith (born October 8, 1959) is a former Republican member of the Kansas Senate, representing the 21st district from 2013 to 2017. Previously he was a member of the Kansas House of Representatives, representing District 22 from 2011 to 2013. 
He is the father of the murdered Kelsey Smith and created the Kelsey Smith Foundation to remember her.

References

External links 
State Page
Ballotpedia
Campaign Website
Votesmart
Follow the Money
Facebook
Twitter

Living people
Republican Party Kansas state senators
1959 births
21st-century American politicians
Avila University alumni